American Tobacco Company Prizery, also known as the Nantucket Warehouse, is a historic tobacco prizery located at Kinston, Lenoir County, North Carolina. It was built in 1901 by the American Tobacco Company, and is a two-story, load-bearing brick building that was constructed in five phases beginning about 1901. It was enlarged between 1901 and 1908, and in 1925, 1930 and 1949.  It has a complex roof structure and features stepped parapets, large segmental arched openings, and thick, load-bearing masonry walls and heavy slow-burn timber posts.

It was listed on the National Register of Historic Places in 2005.

References

Tobacco buildings in the United States
Pr
Industrial buildings and structures on the National Register of Historic Places in North Carolina
Industrial buildings completed in 1901
Buildings and structures in Lenoir County, North Carolina
National Register of Historic Places in Lenoir County, North Carolina